IR or Ir may refer to:

Arts and entertainment
 Integrated resort, a euphemism for a casino in Singapore
 I.R. Baboon, a fictional character in the cartoon series I Am Weasel
 Imperator: Rome, a 2019 video game published by Paradox Interactive

Businesses and organizations

Transportation
 Illinois Railway, US
 Indian Railways, the state-owned railway company of India
 Iran Air (IATA airline code)
 IR Ishikawa Railway, the local railway company in Ishikawa, Japan
 Iarnród Éireann (Irish Rail), the national passenger and freight railway system of the Republic of Ireland
 Israel Railways, the state-owned railway company of Israel

Other businesses and organizations
 Ingersoll Rand (NYSE trading symbol IR)
 International Rectifier, a former manufacturer of power semiconductors
 Independent-Republican Party of Minnesota, former name of the Republican Party of Minnesota

Finance
Incidence rate (market research)
Interest rate, or (when referring to an asset class) interest rate derivative
 Information ratio, when referring to risk-adjusted returns of a financial security
 Investor relations, a management responsibility in which companies disclose information for regulatory compliance and for bond/share-holders to make investment judgments

Science and technology

Biology and medicine
 Immediate-release, related to time release technology in pharmaceuticals
 Incidence Rate, in epidemiology
 Insulin receptor, a transmembrane receptor that is activated by insulin
 Insulin resistance, a pathological condition
 Interventional radiology and interventional radiologist, an independent medical specialty
 Inverted repeat, a sequence of nucleotides that is the reversed complement of another sequence further downstream

Computing
 .ir, the Internet country code top-level domain for Iran
 Adobe ImageReady, a bitmap graphics editor shipped with Adobe Photoshop by Adobe Systems
 Image retention, the LCD and plasma display equivalent of screen burn
 Information retrieval, the science of searching for information in or as documents or databases
 Information revolution, one of the theoretical frameworks within which trends in current society can be conceptualized
 Institutional repository, a digital collection for preserving the intellectual output of an institution
 Institutional research, the collection, analysis, and reporting of institutional data
 Instruction register, part of a CPU's control unit
 Intermediate representation, a computer data structure
 Internal router

Other uses in science and technology
 Ir (newspaper), Latvian weekly newspaper
 Infrared, a portion of the electromagnetic radiation spectrum
 Impulse response, an output function of a dynamic system presented with a brief input signal
 Insulation resistance, a measure of how well the insulation material is performing in an electric appliance
 Ionizing radiation
 Iridium, symbol Ir, a chemical element

Other uses
 
 Industrial relations, the relations between management and workers in industry
 Ingenieur, abbreviated as ir., an engineer's degree awarded by technical universities in the Netherlands, Belgium, Indonesia, and Malaysia.
 Injured reserve list, a reserve list for professional teams to use if a player is injured and unable to play for an extended time
 International relations, in political science, the study of foreign affairs of and relations among states
 International Relations (journal), an academic journal
 International rules football a hybrid code of football
 Iran, by ISO country code
 Ir (cuneiform), a sign in cuneiform writing 
 Ir language, also known as Ta'Oi language. spoken in parts of Laos and Vietnam
 Istro-Romanian language
 InterRegio, part of Swiss Federal Railways

See also
 ℝ, the symbol of the set of real numbers in mathematics
 Inland Revenue Department (disambiguation), a government revenue service in several countries
 International Rescue (disambiguation)
 IRS (disambiguation)